A salad bar is a buffet-style table or counter at a restaurant, food market, or school cafeteria on which salad components are provided for customers or school students to assemble their own salad plates. Most salad bars provide lettuce, chopped tomatoes, assorted raw, sliced vegetables (such as cucumbers, carrots,  celery, olives and green or red bell peppers), dried bread croutons, bacon bits, shredded cheese, and various types of salad dressing. Some salad bars also have additional food items such as cooked cold meats (such as turkey, chicken, ham, or tuna), cooked beans (e.g., chick peas, garbanzo beans or kidney beans), boiled eggs, cottage cheese, cold pasta salads, tortilla chips, bread rolls, soup, and fresh cut fruit slices.

History
Many restaurants have claimed to have originated the salad bar concept. 

The Freund's Sky Club Supper Club in Plover, Wisconsin, is believed to be the first salad bar. Russell Swanson of Swanson Equipment in Stevens Point, Wisconsin, who in 1950 had specialized in the manufacturing of bars for taverns, has stated that he is "most proud of designing and building that first salad bar."

A 1951 Yellow Pages listing refers to the "salad bar buffet" at Springfield, Illinois, restaurant The Cliffs.

Types
Salad bars may be "all-you-can-eat", where the customer may make unlimited plates or bowls of salad during the meal, or be limited to a single serving. Paying by weight of the materials in the salad is also possible; this option is particularly common for carry-out sales. Many supermarkets also include a salad bar (for which customers pay by weight) in the produce or delicatessen section.

See also

 Buffet
 Oyster bar

References

Serving and dining
Salads
Buffet restaurants